Ray Galton OBE (17 July 1930 – 5 October 2018) and Alan Simpson OBE (27 November 1929 – 8 February 2017) were English comedy scriptwriters whose partnership lasted over 50 years. They met in 1948 whilst recuperating from tuberculosis at the Milford Sanatorium, near Godalming in Surrey. They are best known for their work with comedian Tony Hancock on radio and television between 1954 and 1961 and their long-running television situation comedy, Steptoe and Son, eight series of which were aired between 1962 and 1974.

Career
The partnership's break in comedy writing came with the Derek Roy vehicle Happy Go Lucky, although this was not a success. The Hancock connection began with their involvement with later radio variety series, and from November 1954 continued with Hancock's Half Hour on radio; a series featuring their scripts for Hancock ran on television between 1956 and 1961. In October that year Hancock ended his professional relationship with the writers, and with Beryl Vertue who worked with the writers' at their agency Associated London Scripts. This writers' co-operative had been founded by Eric Sykes and Spike Milligan, with others involved, including Hancock for a time.

After their association with Hancock had ended, they wrote a series of Comedy Playhouse (1961–62), ten one-off half-hour plays for the BBC. One play in the series, The Offer, was well received, and from this emerged Steptoe and Son (1962–74), about two rag and bone men, father and son, who live together in a squalid house in West London. This was the basis for the American series Sanford and Son and the Swedish series Albert & Herbert.

Their comedy is characterised by a bleak and somewhat fatalistic tone. Steptoe and Son in particular is, at times, extremely black comedy, and close in tone to social realist drama. Both the character played by Tony Hancock in Hancock's Half Hour and Harold Steptoe (Harry H. Corbett) are pretentious, would-be intellectuals who find themselves trapped by the squalor of their lives. This theme had been expanded upon in their script for Tony Hancock's film The Rebel (1961), about a civil servant who moves to Paris to become an artist. Gabriel Chevallier's novel Clochemerle (1934) was adapted by Galton and Simpson as a BBC/West German co-production in 1972. They contributed the book to Jacob's Journey, a musical accompaniment to a 1973 production of Joseph and the Amazing Technicolor Dreamcoat, which was however soon dropped. Around this time an unbroadcast television pilot entitled Bunclarke With an E was recorded based on a Hancock's Half Hour script, with Arthur Lowe and James Beck, but Beck died before the project could be developed as a series. Another series from this period, Casanova '73 (1973) with Leslie Phillips in the lead, was described by The Times in its obituary of Galton as "disappointingly typical of their later work."

While both writers continued to work after Steptoe and Son ended, including several projects with Frankie Howerd, they had no further high-profile successes. Duncan Wood, the former Hancock and Steptoe producer by then at Yorkshire Television, commissioned The Galton & Simpson Playhouse, a seven-part series broadcast in 1977, featuring leading actors of the time such as Richard Briers, Leonard Rossiter and Arthur Lowe. None of these shows led to another series. Simpson retired from scriptwriting in 1978, becoming an after-dinner speaker, while Galton collaborated in several projects with Johnny Speight.

In 1996 and 1997, comedian Paul Merton revived several Hancock's Half Hour and other Galton and Simpson scripts for ITV to a mixed reception. Ray Galton's Get Well Soon, based on his and Simpson's early sanatorium experiences, was broadcast by the BBC in 1997.

In October 2005, Galton and John Antrobus premiered their play Steptoe and Son in Murder at Oil Drum Lane at the Theatre Royal, York. The play is set in the present day and relates the events that lead to Harold killing his father, and their eventual meeting thirty years later (Albert appearing as a ghost). A series of old plays updated for modern times, entitled Galton and Simpson's Half Hour, was broadcast on BBC Radio 2 in 2009. The series of four episodes was made to celebrate the duo's 60-year anniversary, and the cast consists of Frank Skinner, Mitchell and Webb, Rik Mayall, June Whitfield and Paul Merton. The successful Scandinavian television series Fleksnes Fataliteter and Albert & Herbert were based on Hancock's Half Hour and Steptoe and Son.

Awards
Galton and Simpson were both awarded OBEs in the 2000 honours list for their contribution to British television.

On Saturday 1 June 2013, the British Comedy Society unveiled a blue plaque to Simpson and Galton at Milford Hospital (formerly the sanatorium the pair first met in).

On 8 May 2016, the two men were awarded a BAFTA fellowship for their comedy writing.

References

External links
 
 
 
 DVDCompare review of The Galton and Simpson Playhouse (1977)

English radio writers
English television writers
Screenwriting duos
Officers of the Order of the British Empire